Rising Medical Solutions (Rising) is a US-based firm that provides medical care management and medical cost containment services to the workers’ compensation, auto, liability and group health markets. Their clients are commonly insurance carriers, self-insured employers, government entities, third party administrators (TPAs) and attorneys. Rising publishes an annual Workers’ Compensation Benchmarking Study that addresses how claims organizations deal with industry-wide operational challenges.

History
In 1996, Jason F Beans started a medical management consulting company called BND Operations, of which Rising Medical Solutions grew out of. Rising was officially incorporated in February 1999 and is currently headquartered in Chicago. In addition to their main office in Chicago, Rising has offices in Milwaukee, Phoenix, and Tampa, as well as virtual staff across the US.

Services
Rising provides various services for managing the costs and quality of medical care for workers’ compensation, auto, liability and group health markets. Services include medical bill review, hospital bill review, and provider negotiations, among others. Since 1996, Rising staff have also authored the annual Rhode Island Workers’ Compensation Medical Fee Schedule. 

In 2013, Rising launched a national workers' compensation study to address the research gap on how claims organizations deal with industry-wide operational challenges called the Workers' Compensation Benchmarking Report, a source used by organizations to evaluate priorities, obstacles and strategies amongst their peers.

Awards 
For seven consecutive years, Inc. magazine ranked Rising one of the nation’s fastest-growing private companies on its annual 500|5000 list. The company was named to Crain’s Fast-Fifty list of fastest growing Chicago companies from 2010 to 2013. Jason F Beans, Rising's CEO, was inducted into the Chicago Area Entrepreneurship Hall of Fame in 2015.

See also
 Medicare (United States)
 Medical billing

References

Financial services companies established in 1999
Health care companies based in Illinois
Insurance companies of the United States
Companies based in Illinois
Financial services companies of the United States
1999 establishments in Illinois
American companies established in 1999